Thomas the Archdeacon (c. 1200 – 8 May 1268), also known as Thomas of Spalato, was a Roman Catholic cleric, historian and chronicler from Split (Spalato). He is often referred to as one of the greatest sources in the historiography of Croatian lands.

Life 
What is known about Thomas' life comes from his work, Historia Salonitana. He speaks of his life in the third person and very briefly, in the style of medieval literature genres. Thomas was born in Split at the beginning of the 13th century. It is not known whether he was of noble or common birth, but he represented the elite Roman culture that had survived from before the Slav migration, and he had a negative view of Slavs, often mistakenly conflating them in his chronicle with the Goths. He was probably educated at the cathedral school in Split. Around 1222 he was sent to study at the University of Bologna. There he perfected skills (under, among others, Accursius) in law, rhetoric, gramathic and notary (ars dictandi and ars notaria). He saw Saint Francis of Assisi in Bologna, a remarkable event which he mentioned in his work, describing the person of Saint Francis.
Upon returning to his hometown of Split he advanced fast in church hierarchy. He described the Mongol invasion of Hungary in 1241 and 1242, Mongol customs and homeland, thus creating the first ethnological writings in local historiography. In 1243 a body of canons chose Thomas to be archbishop of Split, however due to his views on Church autonomy in Split, commoners rebelled against him. Fearing for his life, he never occupied that function, and in the end resigned the honor. Because of that, in his work he wrote about future archbishops with bitterness. He died in Split on May 8, 1268. Today, his grave lies in the Church of St. Francis.

Views 

Thomas was a stern advocate of medieval commune movement in Split. He wrote about Croatian nobles (and Hungarian kings in his time) in the hinterland of the city with great animosity, because they tried to crush the autonomy of the city (which was one of the Dalmatian city-states). And conversely, he treated fairly those who respected the commune autonomy (Croatian kings, and later, Hungarian kings in the 13th century). In 1239 he organized new („latin“) administration in Split, bringing Gargane de Ascindis from Ancona, as the new Podestà. He was also an advocate of Church autonomy within the city (in accordance with official Roman Church teaching) which excluded commoners and citizens from interfering in Church business (such as the election of the archbishop).

Work 

Thomas' only work is the Historia Salonitana, the history of the archbishops of Salona and Split written in Latin. The work itself is combining three medieval history genres – historia, chronica and memoriale. Eventually, his work outgrows the narrow theme of archbishops, and becomes an outstanding literary achievement which encompasses the whole of the Croatian medieval period up to the 13th century. Because of Thomas' original research in the archbisphoric's archive in Split, he brings facts and news from documents today unknown to contemporary historians. His work is therefore not only of great literary value, but also of historical value for Croatian history.

References 

History of Split, Croatia
1200 births
1268 deaths
13th-century Roman Catholic clergy
13th-century Roman Catholics
13th-century historians
History of Dalmatia
13th-century Latin writers
Medieval Venetian historians
Republic of Venice clergy
Venetian period in the history of Croatia